Tribe After Tribe is a South African alternative rock band, formed in Johannesburg in 1984 by Robbi Robb. Former members included Robby Whitelaw, Barry Schneider, Bruce Williams, Dino Archon, Fuzzy Marcus, Niels Jensen and Reynold Carlson.

The band relocated to Los Angeles shortly after the release of their first album.

Tribe after Tribe are listed as one of the Top 40 South African Rock Legends by the South African Rock Encyclopedia.

Discography

Singles
 "As I Went Out One Morning" (EMI) (1985)

Albums
 Power (1985), EMI
 Tribe After Tribe (1991), Megaforce/Atlantic
 Love Under Will (1993), Megaforce/Atlantic
 Pearls Before Swine (1997)
 Enchanted Entrance (2002), Dreamcatcher Records
 M.O.A.B (2009)
 Burg Herzberg Festival (2009)

References

Musical groups established in 1984
South African alternative rock groups